"Tu m'oublieras" is a song by French singer Larusso. It was the second single from her debut album, Simplement, and was released on 26 October 1998. It remains Larusso's most successful single, topping the chart of France and the Wallonia region of Belgium.

Song information
The song was originally performed by Irma Jackson in 1979 (as "You Will Forget"), then by Régine in 1980, then by Jeane Manson, under the title "Tu oublieras". Yves Dessca, who participated in the composition of the song, had previously written some songs for Michel Sardou and for the Eurovision Song Contest 1971. Unlike the original version, Larusso's cover contains many scats, modern gimmicks and some lyrics in English.

In France, the single featured in the top 100 for 42 weeks, from 28 November 1998. It debuted at number 34 on 28 November 1998, then climbed to number one on 31 January 1999. It stayed there for 12 weeks, totalling 26 weeks in the top 10 and 38 weeks in the top 50.

Track listings
CD single
 "Tu m'oublieras" (radio edit) – 3:40
 "Tu m'oublieras" (unforgettable mix) – 4:53
 "Je survivrai" – 3:57

7-inch single
 "Tu m'oublieras" (radio edit) – 3:40
 "Tu m'oublieras" (club mix) – 4:54

7-inch single – Remixes
 "Tu m'oublieras" (hip hop club mix)
 "Je survivrai" (club mix)

Charts

Weekly charts

Year-end charts

Certifications and sales

References

1979 songs
1998 singles
Franglais songs
Larusso songs
SNEP Top Singles number-one singles
Ultratop 50 Singles (Wallonia) number-one singles